"The Circle" is a song by English rock band Ocean Colour Scene, released on 16 September 1996 as the fourth single form their second studio album, Moseley Shoals (1996). The song reached number six on the UK Singles Chart the same month. Like the previous single, this single was also released as an acoustic alternative on a second CD with additional B-sides.

Track listings
UK CD1
 "The Circle"
 "Mrs Jones"
 "Cool Cool Water"
 "Top of the World"

UK CD2
 "The Circle" (acoustic)
 "Chelsea Walk"
 "Alibis"
 "Day Tripper" (featuring Liam and Noel Gallagher)

UK cassette single
 "The Circle"
 "Day Tripper"

Credits and personnel
Credits are taken from the Moseley Shoals album booklet.

Studio
 Recorded and mixed at Moseley Shoals (Birmingham, England)
 Mastered at the Powerplant (London, England)

Personnel

 Ocean Colour Scene – writing, production
 Simon Fowler – vocals, acoustic guitar
 Steve Cradock – guitar, piano, vocals
 Oscar Harrison – drums, piano, vocals
 Damon Minchella – bass guitar
 Paul Weller – guitar
 Brendan Lynch – production
 Martin Heyes – engineering
 Tony Keach – assistant engineering
 Tim Young – mastering

Charts

References

External links
 1996 Billboard magazine review of Moseley Shoals
 Ocean Colour Scene official website

Ocean Colour Scene songs
1996 singles
1996 songs
MCA Records singles
Song recordings produced by Brendan Lynch (music producer)
Songs written by Damon Minchella
Songs written by Oscar Harrison
Songs written by Simon Fowler
Songs written by Steve Cradock